is a Japanese liqueur made by steeping ume plums (while still unripe and green) in  and sugar. It has a sweet, sour taste, and an alcohol content of 10–15%. Famous brands of umeshu include Choya, Takara Shuzo and Matsuyuki. Varieties are available with whole ume fruits contained in the bottle, and some people make their own umeshu at home.

Japanese restaurants serve many different varieties of umeshu and also make cocktails. Umeshu on the Rocks (pronounced umeshu rokku), Umeshu Sour (pronounced umeshu sawa), Umeshu Tonic (with tonic water), and Umeshu Soda (with carbonated water) are popular. It is sometimes mixed with green tea (o-cha-wari) or warm water (o-yu-wari). Umeshu can be served at different temperatures; chilled or with ice, room temperature, or even hot in the winter.

Umeshu can be made either from real plum fruit, or using additive flavours and perfumes to emulate the taste of plums. Umeshu which is made from exclusively plum fruit (without additives) will be labelled as Honkaku Umeshu and will typically be made only from ume fruit, sugar, and alcohol.

Homemade umeshu
 Main ingredients include:
 Ume fruits
 Sugar (rock)
 Shōchū
 Traditional recipe:
 Ume fruit 1 kg
 Sugar 500g–1 kg (rock/cubes)
 Shōchū 1.8l
 After three months in a cold and dark place, it is ready to be consumed (although it is better to wait at least six months)
Umeshu should be allowed to ripen for at least nine months.

See also
 Suanmeitang, Chinese plum beverage
 Maesil-ju, Korean plum wine

References

External links

 
 
 
 A recipe for umeshu
 Umeshuthai

Rice wine
Fruit liqueurs
Japanese liqueurs
Plum dishes